Muna Kalameya Durka (born June 19, 1988) is a Sudanese steeplechase runner. Durka represented Sudan at the 2008 Summer Olympics in Beijing, where she competed for the first ever women's 3000 metres steeplechase. She ran in the second heat against sixteen other athletes, including Russia's Tatyana Petrova, who eventually won the bronze medal in the final. She finished the race in ninth place by six seconds behind Ethiopia's Sofia Assefa, with a time of 9:53.09. Durka, however, failed to advance into the final, as she placed thirty-eighth overall, and was ranked below four mandatory slots for the next round.

References

External links

NBC 2008 Olympics profile

1988 births
Living people
Sudanese steeplechase runners
Sudanese female middle-distance runners
Olympic athletes of Sudan
Athletes (track and field) at the 2008 Summer Olympics
Female steeplechase runners
21st-century Sudanese women